Quasiconus is a subgenus of sea snails, marine gastropod mollusks in the genus Conus, family Conidae, the cone snails and their allies.

In the latest classification of the family Conidae by Puillandre N., Duda T.F., Meyer C., Olivera B.M. & Bouchet P. (2015), Quasiconus has become a subgenus of Conus as Conus (Quasiconus)Tucker & Tenorio, 2009  (type species:Conus melvilli G. B. Sowerby III, 1879 ) represented as Conus Linnaeus, 1758

Species
 Quasiconus melvilli (G.B. Sowerby III, 1879) represented as Conus melvilli G. B. Sowerby III, 1879 (alternate representation)
 Quasiconus tuticorinensis (Röckel & Korn, 1990) represented as Conus tuticorinensis Röckel & Korn, 1990 (alternate representation)

References

External links
 To World Register of Marine Species

Conidae
Gastropod subgenera